The history of limnology in Nepal focuses on the study of limnology in Nepal, which has been done by many foreign and Nepali researchers and students of Tribhuvan University.

Parameters 
The research was done mainly on the following parameters:
 pH
 aquatic plants and their types
 composition of fresh water
 water and land relationship
 seasonal changes in the lakes

Studies 
 In 1970 The first study was done by  a German limnologist L.Loffler in Khumbu area.
 In 1980 there were 20 studies.
 Until 1990 the number of studies were 20.
 From 2001–2009 76 studies were done in lakes and ponds like Tilicho, Rara. The first study on Tilicho Lake was in 1959.

Field laboratory 
"In April 1977 work was started on a laboratory office building. This was ready for use in September 1977. The building offers sufficient space, a good laboratory bench with power outlets, etc. A library room is also provided. However, the building might prove unsatisfactory for continuing activities if leakage problems are not attended to."
Upon establishment of the laboratory some of the equipment and tools included were a stereo microscope, microscope, top pan balance, "a Hachkit for simple chemical analysis and a refrigerator".
 Later other equipment was procured including a hydrographic winch, rubber dinghy, portable echosounder, laboratory glassware, and specimen jars.

See also 
 List of rivers of Nepal
 List of lakes of Nepal

References

External links 
  Study of Himalayan Lakes in Nepal

Limnology
Water in Nepal